Khayala Abdulla (born 13 July 1993) is an Azerbaijani chess player who holds the title of Woman Grandmaster (WGM, 2015).

Chess career
In 2010 in Batumi Khayala Abdulla won bronze medal in European Youth Chess Championship in age category U18. In 2011 she won Azerbaijani Youth Chess Championship in age category U18, but in age category U20 had the second place. In 2012 Khayala Abdulla repeatedly won the silver medal in Azerbaijani Youth Chess Championship in age category U20. 

Twice winner of the Azerbaijani Women's Chess Championships (2013, 2014).

Khayala Abdulla played for Azerbaijan in Women's Chess Olympiads:
 In 2014, at third board in the 41st Chess Olympiad (women) in Tromsø (+3, =3, -2),
 In 2016, at second board (Azerbaijan 2) in the 42nd Chess Olympiad (women) in Baku (+1, =0, -4).

Khayala Abdulla played for Azerbaijan in European Team Chess Championship:
 In 2013, at third board in the 10th European Team Chess Championship (women) in Warsaw (+2, =2, -2),
 In 2015, at fourth board in the 11th European Team Chess Championship (women) in Reykjavik (+1, =3, -2).

In 2010 she awarded the FIDE Woman International Master (WIM) title, and in 2015 the Woman Grandmaster (WGM) title.

References

External links

1993 births
Living people
Azerbaijani female chess players
Chess woman grandmasters
Chess Olympiad competitors